Eudonia senecaensis is a species of moth in the family Crambidae. It is found in France.

References

Moths described in 1993
Eudonia
Moths of Europe